DE, de, or dE may refer to:

Human names
 De (surname), a Bengali family name
 de, a nobiliary particle
 Dé (footballer, 1940–1992), Ademar José Ribeiro, Brazilian football left-back
 Dé (footballer, born 1998), Cledson Carvalho da Silva, Brazilian football forward

Language and linguistics
 De (Cyrillic), a letter in the Cyrillic script
 German language (ISO 639-1 alpha-2 code)
 De (kana), a Japanese hiragana/katakana
 de (interjection)
 de-, an English prefix conveying negation
 Downward entailing, a linguistic expression that denotes a monotone decreasing function

Media and business
 Condor (airline) (IATA code), a German airline
 Douwe Egberts, a coffee brand
 Digital Extremes, a Canadian-operated computer and video game development studio
 Daily Express, a British tabloid newspaper
 John Deere (NYSE stock ticker symbol), an American machinery manufacturer

Military
 Defence Estates, an agency of the UK Ministry of Defence
 Desert Eagle, a large-caliber semi-automatic pistol manufactured by Magnum Research
 Destroyer escort (US Navy hull classification symbol)

Places
 Dé, Mali, a commune and town in Mali
 De River, Mizoram, India
 Germany (ISO 3166-1 alpha-2 country code)
 .de, the ccTLD for Germany
 Delaware (United States postal symbol)
 DE postcode area, for Derby and surrounding areas of England

Science, technology, and mathematics
 Desktop environment, a graphical user interface commonly based on a desktop metaphor
 Dextrose equivalent, the relative sweetness of sugars
 Diatomaceous earth, a naturally occurring, soft, siliceous sedimentary rock mineral
 Differential equation, an equation which derivatives of a function appear as variables
 Differential evolution, a method of mathematical optimization
 Design engineer, engineer whose specialty is in design 
 Doctor of Engineering, a degree equivalent to a Ph.D. in engineering
 Dwarf elliptical galaxy (dE), in astronomy
 Dynamics Explorer, a NASA satellite mission
 Haplogroup DE (Y-DNA), a human Y-chromosome DNA haplogroup in genetics
 ΔE (color space) (dE), a mathematical measurement of the distance between two points in a Lab color space

Other uses
 De (Chinese), a concept of integrity in Daoism and virtue in Confucianism
 Defensive end, a position in American and Canadian football
 Distance education, studying through a correspondence course
 De, a scale degree in tonic sol-fa (sharpened form of doh)

See also
 Department of Education, a common government department